APRA's Top 30 Australian songs was a list created by the Australasian Performing Right Association (APRA) in 2001, to celebrate its 75th anniversary. A panel of 100 music personalities were asked to list the "ten best and most significant Australian songs of the past 75 years". The top ten songs, in numerical order, were announced on 28 May 2001 at the APRA Awards. The next twenty were not ordered and had been released nearly four weeks earlier, on 2 May, in a media statement by APRA representative Debbie Kruger.

At the 2001 APRA Awards ceremony You Am I performed the No.1 listed song "Friday on My Mind" with Harry Vanda of The Easybeats guesting on guitar. Ross Wilson of Daddy Cool performed the No.2 listed song "Eagle Rock", while Midnight Oil's "Beds are Burning" at No.3 was shown on video introduced by Senator Aden Ridgeway as an Indigenous spokesperson on reconciliation.

Top Ten songs

The remaining 20 songs
Listed in chronological order:

See also
 APRA Top 100 New Zealand Songs of All Time

References

External links
 Milesago website

 
Lists of rated songs